Muckadilla is a rural town and locality in the Maranoa Region, Queensland, Australia.

Geography 

The town lies in the northern part of the locality. The Western railway line passes through the locality from east to west. The town is serviced by the Muckadilla railway station immediately to the north of the town. The Warrego Highway passes from east to west through the town, mostly being parallel immediately south of the railway line.

Muckadilla Creek flows from Mount Bindango to the north down to the south-east of Muckadilla to Mount Abundance, passing just west of the town. The creek becomes Cogoon River and then is a tributary of the Balonne River.Colonial surveyor and explorer Thomas Mitchell followed this stream through this area in 1846, prior to european settlement.

The land is mostly 350-400m above sea level and used for grazing and cropping. Some of the slopes of the higher peaks (to 470m) in the south-west of the locality remain densely forested.

History 
The name Muckadilla was first used as the creek name, which in turn is believed to be an Aboriginal word (language and dialect unknown) to mean plenty of water.

Muckadilla Provisional School opened on 25 January 1886. It was proclaimed Muckadilla State School on 1 January 1909. The school was mothballed on 31 December 2008, then closed on 31 December 2009. The school was on a  site at the southern end of Centenary Drive. The school's website was archived.

In 1889, the Queensland Government drilled a bore at Muckadilla. Although the water supply found was quite small, it was believed that it had healing properties and people flocked to Muckadilla in search of a cure. Dr E.W. Kerr of Brisbane endorsed the water, claiming it had cured "obstinate rheumatism" in some of his patients. The baths were popular and, in 1939, John McEwan Hunter proposed that a sanitorium should be built there to better allow people to improve their "rheumatism, arthritis, uritus, digestion, nerves and general health".

Education 
There are no schools in Muckadilla. The nearest government primary schools are Roma State College in Roma to the east, Mitchell State School in Mitchell to the west, and Dunkeld State School in Dunkeld to the south-west. The nearest government secondary schools are Mitchell State School (to Year 10) and Roma State College (to Year 12).

Amenities 

The town has a hotel motel and a community hall.

Popular culture 
Muckadilla is one of the towns listed in the first verse of I've Been Everywhere.

References

Further reading

External links 

Towns in Queensland
Maranoa Region
Hot springs of Australia
Localities in Queensland
Western railway line, Queensland